The team classification in the Vuelta a España is a prize that is contested in the Vuelta a España. It has been awarded since the race's inception in 1935.

Winners

Multiple winners

See also
 Team classification in the Giro d'Italia
 Team classification in the Tour de France

References

Team classification
Spanish sports trophies and awards